Song Boxuan (born 16 September 1989) is a Chinese footballer who currently plays for Henan Jianye in the Chinese Super League.

Club career
Starting his football career at third-tier side Tianjin Locomotive, Song Boxuan was scouted by top-tier side Shanghai Shenhua which he eventually joined at the beginning of the 2010 league season with teammate Feng Renliang. He was immediately selected as the team's first-choice left winger by the then manager Miroslav Blažević and would make his debut on 23 March 2010 in a league game against Changsha Ginde which ended in a 2–0 defeat. Despite the defeat, Song would keep his place within the team and he gained considerable playing time throughout the season. Established as a vital member of the team, he would go on to score his first goal for the club on 24 October 2010 in a league game against Shaanxi Renhe in a 3–2 victory.

On 3 January 2014, Song transferred to fellow Chinese Super League side Beijing Guoan. He made his debut for the club on 7 April 2014 in a 2–0 win against Guangzhou R&F. He scored his first goal for the club on 11 April 2014 in a 2–1 win over Guizhou Renhe. He was plagued with injuries, missing 60 Super League matches of 120 from 2014 to 2017.

Song was linked with his hometown club Tianjin Teda after the 2017 season. On 26 February 2018, he transferred to Tianjin Teda's city rival Tianjin Quanjian in the Chinese Super League. He made his debut on 10 March 2018 in a 2–1 home loss to Beijing Renhe, coming on as a substitute for Wang Xiaolong in the 67th minute.

International career
After an impressive start with Shanghai Shenhua, Song would be called up to the Chinese under-23 national team to take part in the 2010 Asian Games where he played in all three group games before seeing China get knocked out in the knockout stage. Song was called up for the Chinese national team in June 2015 for the 2018 FIFA World Cup qualification, replacing injury Yu Hai. He made his senior international debut on 16 June 2015 in a 6–0 away win against Bhutan, coming on for Gao Lin in the 70th minute.

Career statistics
Statistics accurate as of match played 31 December 2020.

References

External links
Player stats at sohu.com
Player profile at Shanghai Shenhua website
 
 

1989 births
Living people
Chinese footballers
Footballers from Tianjin
Shanghai Shenhua F.C. players
Beijing Guoan F.C. players
Tianjin Tianhai F.C. players
Henan Songshan Longmen F.C. players
Chinese Super League players
China League Two players
China international footballers
Footballers at the 2010 Asian Games
Association football wingers
Asian Games competitors for China